Mohammadreza Bayrami (born 1961 in Ardabil) – is an Iranian Azerbaijani writer of Persian literature whose main forms of writing are the Dastan and the novel. He won Badge Golden Safavid in Iran for promoting Persian Language and Literature.

Early life
In 1965, Bayrami was born near the Sabalan mountain in Ardabil, Azerbaijan province, Iran, and emigrated with his parents to Tehran & Karaj in 1962, where he is currently living. In 1987, he became a conscript soldier for the Iranian army and served his country in the war with Iraq.

Influenced by
 Samad Behrangi
 Ali Ashraf Darvishian

Works
The Mountain Called Me
Hello Stone
The Tales of Sabalan
Djalal reitet um sein Leben
The Edge of the Cliff
Line of contact

References

1965 births
People from Ardabil
Living people
Iranian male novelists
Iranian novelists
Iran's Book of the Year Awards recipients
Iranian male writers